KOSE (860 AM) is an American Southern gospel/ country music formatted broadcast radio station licensed to serve the community of Wilson, Arkansas, and broadcasting to Mississippi County in Arkansas and Lauderdale and Tipton counties in Tennessee. KOSE is owned and operated by Newport Broadcasting Company.

860 AM is a Canadian clear-channel frequency; KOSE must reduce nighttime power to protect the skywave signal of CJBC in Toronto, Ontario.

References

External links

KOSE Wilson Legal ID

1949 establishments in Arkansas
Gospel radio stations in the United States
Radio stations established in 1949
Southern Gospel radio stations in the United States
OSE
Wilson, Arkansas